María Lourdes Carlé (born 10 February 2000) is an Argentine professional tennis player.

On the ITF Junior Circuit, Carlé has a career-high ranking of 9, achieved in November 2017. On the ITF Women's World Tennis Tour, she has won nine singles titles and five doubles titles so far.

Playing for Argentina Fed Cup team, Carlé has a win–loss record of 5–4 (as of Dec 2022).

Junior career

Grand Slam performance
Singles:
 Australian Open: –
 French Open: 3R (2018)
 Wimbledon: 3R (2018)
 US Open: 1R (2018)

Doubles:
 Australian Open: –
 French Open: SF (2017)
 Wimbledon: 1R (2016)
 US Open: –

Career
She made her WTA Tour debut at the 2022 Copa Colsanitas.

Performance timeline

Singles
Current after the 2023 Australian Open.

WTA 125 tournament finals

Doubles: 1 (runner-up)

ITF Circuit finals

Singles: 11 (9 titles, 2 runner–ups)

Doubles: 13 (5 titles, 8 runner–ups)

Fed Cup/Billie Jean King Cup

Singles (4–2)

Doubles (1–2)

Notes

References

External links
 
 
 

2000 births
Living people
Argentine female tennis players
People from Daireaux Partido
People from Tandil
Tennis players at the 2018 Summer Youth Olympics
Sportspeople from Buenos Aires Province
21st-century Argentine women